Rugulina verrilli is a species of sea snail, a marine gastropod mollusk in the family Pendromidae.

Description
The white shell grows to a length of 2.2 mm. It is widely umbilicated and depressed, with a low spire. it is finely, longitudinally, obliquely striate, with several spiral lines on the body whorl above the periphery. These become more numerous and closer on the base. The spire consists of 3½ whorls with the last one large and very convex. The base of the shell is oblique. The large aperture is very obliquely ovate. The periphery is thin and sharp.

Distribution
This marine species occurs in the colder waters off eastern USA.

References

External links
 To Encyclopedia of Life
 To World Register of Marine Species

Pendromidae
Gastropods described in 1888